Mailsi is a city in southern Punjab, Pakistan. It is the headquarters of Mailsi Tehsil, an administrative subdivision of Vehari District.

Description
It is one of the largest tehsil of Vehari District; the cities of Lodhran and Vehari were created from Mailsi in the nineteenth and twentieth centuries. Vehari, now a district, was sub-tehsil of Mailsi. Mailsi is well known because of its cotton crops. Mailsi is known for the Jhandhir Library and Siphon at the Sutlej river. The Mailsi Siphon was constructed by the Gamon construction company in 1964 to control the water flow between the Sutlej river and the Sindhnai Link canal.

Mailsi is a municipality in and Tehsil Headquarters of the Vehari district. The city's center is the oldest part of the community, consisting of muhallas, koochas, and bazaars situated inside the circular road. Before the independence of Pakistan in 1947, this section of the city was occupied by Hindu merchants and landlords. There were buildings of historic significance in the city, now largely demolished but a few of which still exist, such as a well (chasma baoli) built by Chaudry Balik Ram Jugga, and the shrine of Syed Nathey Shah Gardezi& Dhkou Tahseel, pipal, pakka, faddah, and thana bazaar are situated in the old part of the city while Quaid e Azam, Multan, and Allama Iqbal Roads, Model Town, Rehman Town and Qazi town are examples of recent expansion. The first modern area was developed in the 1960s for meeting the housing needs of the Gamon company's European workers and engineers; this area is now Mailsi Garrison, housing Pakistan's army defence units. There were two cotton ginning factories in Mailsi prior to independence; the increase in cultivated area resulted in high production of cotton which led to establishment of cotton ginning factories and oil mills. In the city of Mailsi there are many towns, including Madina Town and Fadaa Town. The old name of Madina Town was Purani city. Near Madina Town, and other Mohala Kacha Kot is a historical place there are Committee Baag, old Stadium, girls School, and many old buildings. Mouza Daroher Wahin the great Mouza of Mailsi. It is situated on the Bank of canal Chit Dain. Mouza Daorher Wahin on the name of Peer Haji Sultan Ahmad Shah Almaroof Saji Ahmad Shah. Three Shrines in this Mouza First Shrine Peer Shah Jalal-Ud-Din and his two sons Peer Haji Ahmad Shah And Peer Sayad Abu Baqir Shair. This Mouza have one Bazar called Medan. It is the land of Olias of Allah.

Malsian Tradition 
Malsian is notorious as the headquarters of Mohammadan Sunars who were engaged in the manufacture of coins and coins of ancient mintage for many of the principal cities of India. Malsian is also said to have excelled in making wooden stamps for printing cotton. It also made buttons from shells from the river, and dyeing of wool is another of the trades carried out.

Geography and climate
Mailsi is located in the Indus Valley near the city of Multan in central Pakistan. The area around the city is a flat, alluvial plain ideal for agriculture. The canals which cut across the tehsil provide irrigation. The Indus Water Treaty sold the water in the Sutlej river to India; the reduced water flow in the river had had a pronounced effect on the flora and fauna of the area. The Mailsi Siphon was built to control the water flow in the Sidhnai Link Canal and Sutlej river under this same Indus Water Treaty.

Mailsi features an arid climate with hot summers and mild winters. The city witnesses some of the most extreme weather in the country. The highest recorded temperature is 54 °C (129 °F), and the lowest recorded temperature is −1 °C (30.2 °F). The average rainfall is 127 millimeters (5.0 in). Dust storms are a common occurrence within the city.

It is located at 29°48'1N 72°10'33E at an altitude of 126 m (416 ft).
Mailsi Canal is also named after this city.

Agriculture
Farming is the primary economic activity in Mailsi and exports include cotton, wheat, sugarcane, rice, and henna. Since independence, the amount of cultivated land has increased. Irrigation systems have been affected by the shortage of water in Sutlej River. There are three canals, Mailsi Link, Faddah and Dhamakki, There are many sub-canals and a number of streams for irrigation is also there.

Mailsi lies in the temperate zone of Pakistan. The climate is arid, characterized by hot summers and cool winters, and wide variations between extremes of temperature at given locations.

Mailsi has four seasons: a cool, dry winter from December through February; a hot, dry spring from March through May; the southwest monsoon period, from June through September; and the retreating monsoon period of October and November. The onset and duration of these seasons vary somewhat according to location.

Government
Mailsi is a Tehsil Headquarters of the city of Mailsi and one of the Tehsil/administrative areas of the Vehari district. The city of Mailsi is also the headquarters of Mailsi Tehsil, and the city of Mailsi is administratively subdivided into 31 Union Councils.

Education

The first Government Primary School was established in 1864 during British Raj after failed freedom war of 1858. In 1920, a primary school was given the status of middle school. Later, in 1942, it became a high school. The first girls’ high school was established in 1890, which later became a middle high school in 1972.

in 1949, Islamic Educational Institute Jamia Taleem Ul QUran, Multan Road Mailsi was established by Mufti Muhammad Kaleemullah, Where 1000+ students learned Islamic studies.

In 1976, Inter College for boys was established and in 1980, a girls' college was established. In 1986, Commercial Training Institute was established. In 1995, both colleges were converted into degree granting institutions. In 1980, the Federal Government established F.G public school, as the first English medium school for the citizens of Mailsi. Now there are several private English medium schools. There are two Government Degree Colleges, one for boys and another for girls, five higher secondary schools and 596 government schools, including 32 high schools.

Education was primarily a government affair before the late 1970s. On 2 January 1972, the Government of Prime Minister Zulfiqar Ali Bhutto nationalized educational institutions throughout Pakistan. Even though there is no evidence of the existence of a private school before that 1972, the nationalization of educational efforts across Pakistan curb development of any private sector educational institutions. In 1977, the Marshal Law Government of Zia-ul-Haq allowed for limited privatization and opening of private educational institutions. Among the first few new private educational institutions in Pakistan, was Mailsi Model School on Multan Road. Due to its focus on Girls' education, Mailsi Model School became a very successful institution and a school of choice for the girls from affluent families in Mailsi. The school opened its doors in 1977. Since the early 2000s, a number of private schools have been established in the city.

Allied School, Hawks Public School, City Public School, Al-Rehan School System, Dawn Public School and APS&AC are local institutes. IPS College, Punjab College, Superior College and Vista College are local colleges.

Transportation
Mailsi, میلسی, is located on the northern alternate rail and overland route to Bahawalpur and Lahore, the capital of the Punjab province of Pakistan. The western route connects with Multan and in south-east side Bahawalpur & south-west is Kahror Pakka.

Bus, rail and air service connects Mailsi to other parts of Pakistan.

Telecommunication
Land line based companies and mobile phone companies serve Mailsi.
in south there is Khair Pur Tamewali and in south east there is Hasilpur city. Moreover, every mobile network companies also operate in the city with 3G-4G Band facility.

Monuments and recreational places 
In the city, a historic mosque named as "Shahi Masjid" is located in the village Jallah Jeem. It is said that it was built by Mughal Emperor Shahjahan. A zoo is also situated in the city named as "Garrison Park". A public park named as TMO Park is also there to provide citizens space for recreational activities. Ladies Park is built for the recreation of the female members of the society. Mailsi Siphon, situated near the city on the river Sutlej, is a picnic-spot.  Sardar Pur Jandhir Library also attracts a number of students and researchers across the country to it.
There is one canal in Mailsi city near Kent area.
A badshahi mosque located in Moza Malik Wahin. Its foundation was placed by empire Orangzaib Alamgier. It was started in 1653 and completed in 1706.

References

Populated places in Vehari District